Carmen Küng (born 30 January 1978) is a curler from Solothurn, Switzerland.

Carmen Küng began her senior elite career as the Third for 2002 Olympic Silver medalist Luzia Ebnöther during the 2006–2007 season. (During this season future Olympic teammate Carmen Schäfer threw second stones.) She would later move to the team of Silvana Tirinzoni for the 2008–2009 season.

In the following season she joined her current team. Initially she joined Mirjam Ott's team as the Alternate and served in that capacity at both the 2008 and 2009 World Championships.

Starting with the 2009–2010 competitive season Carmen Küng has played as the Second for Team Ott. The highlights for the team include winning the Silver medal at the 2009 European Curling Championships and an appearance at the 2010 Vancouver Olympic Games.

Teammates 
2010 Vancouver Olympic Games

Mirjam Ott, Skip

Carmen Schäfer, Third

Janine Greiner, Lead

Irene Schori, Alternate

2008 Vernon World Championships

2008 Örnsköldsvik European Championships

2009 Gangneung World Championships

2009 Aberdeen European Championships

Mirjam Ott, Skip

Carmen Schäfer, Third

Valeria Spälty, Second

Janine Greiner, Lead

Note: for the 2009 European Championships Valeria Spälty was not on the team. Carmen Küng threw second stones and Binia Feltscher-Beeli served as the Alternate.

References

External links

Living people
Swiss female curlers
People from Solothurn
Olympic curlers of Switzerland
Curlers at the 2010 Winter Olympics
Curlers at the 2014 Winter Olympics
1978 births
World curling champions
Continental Cup of Curling participants
European curling champions
Sportspeople from the canton of Solothurn
21st-century Swiss women